Majid Eidi (born September 19, 1996) is an Iranian footballer who plays for Paykan of the Persian Gulf Pro League as a midfielder.

References

External links 

 Iran Premier League Stats
Majid Eydi on instagram

Iranian footballers
Association football midfielders
Living people
Naft Masjed Soleyman F.C. players
1996 births
People from Arak, Iran